The Segen Gottes Show Mine is a show mine in the parish of Schnellingen in the municipality of Haslach in the Central Black Forest in Germany.

History 
The silver mine of Segen Gottes was first mentioned in the records in the 13th century, but is probably older. The mine was closed in the 18th century.

In 1997 mining enthusiasts began opening the adits and mineshafts. The town of Haslach decided to make these witnesses of medieval mining open to the public as a show mine.

See also 
 List of show mines

References

Literature 
 Wolfgang Werner, Volker Dennert: Lagerstätten und Bergbau im Schwarzwald. Herausgabe durch Landesamt für Geologie, Rohstoffe und Bergbau, Baden-Württemberg, Freiburg im Breisgau, 2004, .

External links 
 Besucherbergwerk Segen Gottes on the Haslach website

Show mines
Former mines in Germany
Silver mines in Germany
Museums in Baden-Württemberg
Black Forest
Ortenaukreis